House at 56 Cornelia Street is a historic home located at Plattsburgh in Clinton County, New York.  It was built in about 1850 and is a two-story, rectangular building on a stone foundation.  It features a porch with a moulded cornice and decorative brackets.

It was listed on the National Register of Historic Places in 1982.

References

Houses on the National Register of Historic Places in New York (state)
Houses completed in 1850
Houses in Clinton County, New York
National Register of Historic Places in Clinton County, New York